Rosalba C. Todaro (died 18 December 2022) was an economist and Senior Researcher at the Centro de Estudios de la Mujer (Women’s Studies Centre) in Santiago, Chile,  and was the president of the International Association for Feminist Economics (IAFFE) from 2011 to 2012.

Todaro also worked as an advisor to SERNAM (Servicio Nacional de la Mujer/Chile's National Women's Service), and she was on the board of directors of the Asociación Latinoamericana de Sociología del Trabajo (Latin American Association of Labour Sociology- ALAST).

Selected bibliography

Books 
 
 
  
 
  In English as "Mechanisms of power: men and women in the modern corporation."
 
 
 
  In English as "On women and globalization."
 
  In English as "Work is transformed: production relations and gender relations."

Papers

See also 
 Feminist economics
 List of feminist economists

References 

20th-century births
Year of birth missing
2022 deaths
20th-century Chilean economists
21st-century Chilean economists
Chilean feminist writers
Feminist economists
Presidents of the International Association for Feminist Economics
Women's rights in Chile